(14 November 1879 – 9 September 1955) was a Japanese Nihonga painter, member of the Japan Art Academy, Imperial Household Artist, and emeritus professor at the Kyoto City University of Arts. In 1922 he travelled to Europe, in particular England, France, and Italy, where he studied the traditions of western art as well as contemporary movements such as Fauvism and Cubism.

See also

 Yōga

References

Nihonga painters
1879 births
1955 deaths